The NHL All-Star Celebrity Challenge was a benefit hockey game to raise money for Hockey's All-Star Kids and Children's Hospital Los Angeles. The games featured celebrities teaming up with NHL alumni on two teams led by Jerry Bruckheimer and David E. Kelley. The teams were named Bruckheimer's Bad Boys and Kelley's Heroes.

Presented by Microsoft Windows XP, the NHL All-Star Celebrity Challenge was held in Los Angeles at the Staples Center on Wednesday, January 30, 2002.

Rosters

Bruckheimer's Bad Boys
Kim Alexis
Glenn Anderson 
Allan Bester 
Dave Coulier 
Mark DeCarlo 
Ryan Dempster
Ron Duguay 
Phil Esposito 
Bobby Farrelly 
Brendan Fehr 
Matt Frewer
Rod Gilbert  
Cuba Gooding, Jr. 
Scott Grimes 
Paul Guilfoyle 
Chris Jericho 
Jari Kurri
McG
Barry Melrose
Bernie Nicholls 
Rene Robert 
Michael Rosenbaum
Kiefer Sutherland 
Dave Taylor
Alan Thicke 
Alex Trebek 
Mike Vallely
Llewellyn Wells

Kelley's Heroes
Stephen Baldwin
Rachel Blanchard
David Boreanaz 
Mel Bridgman 
Dino Ciccarelli 
Patrick Flatley
Jerry Houser 
Joshua Jackson 
Pat LaFontaine
Denis Leary 
Pete Mahovlich 
Lanny McDonald 
Neal McDonough 
Mark McGrath 
Dan Moriarty
Lochlyn Munro
Mike Murphy
Ken Olandt 
Rob Paulsen 
Pete Peeters
Larry Playfair 
Jason Priestley
Chad Smith
Peter Šťastný
D. B. Sweeney
Michael Vartan 
Barry Watson 
Scott Wolf

Unchosen from Draft
Enrico Colantoni
Alan Doyle 
Frank Gehry
Michel Goulet 
Sean McCann 
Rogatien Vachon
Donnie Wahlberg

Staff

Assistant coaches
Brad Garrett 
Jeremy Piven 
Bill Goldberg 
 
Trainers
Patricia Heaton 
Dulé Hill 
Colin Mochrie 
Jane Seymour

References

Celebrity Challenge
Ice hockey in Los Angeles